Il Silenzio is an album by Dalida. It marked her comeback to a more successful career (her last big hit was the 1962's "Le petit Gonzales"). It contains her success "Il Silenzio (Bonsoir mon amour)", "Scandale dans la famille" and the Greek flavoured "La danse de Zorba" (her singing version of "Zorba's Dance" by Mikis Theodorakis for the 1964's movie Zorba the Greek).

Track listing
 Il Silenzio (Bonsoir mon amour)
 Tu me voles
 Son chapeau
 La vie en rose
 Toi pardonne-moi
 Le flamenco
 Scandale dans la famille
 Le soleil et la montagne
 C'est irréparable
 Un enfant
 Je ne dirai ni oui, ni non
 La danse de Zorba

Singles
1965 La danse de Zorba
1965 Viva la pappa / Hene ma tov / Le printemps sur la colline / La Sainte Totoche
1965 Il Silenzio (Bonsoir mon amour)

References
 Dalida Official Website

External links
 Dalida Official Website "Discography" section

Dalida albums
1965 albums
French-language albums
Barclay (record label) albums